Manuel Sarao (born 11 October 1989) is an Italian footballer who plays as a forward for club Catania

Club career
Born in Milan, capital of Lombardy region, Sarao was a player of Lombard clubs in 2011–12 Serie D and 2012–13 Serie D (except Gozzano in Piedmont).

Sarao joined Serie B club Carpi on 12 July 2013 He was immediately left for the third division club Savona.

Sarao made his professional debut on 4 August 2013, 0–1 lost to Perugia. The cup match he substituted Christian Esposito at half time. At the end of the season for the signature Giana Erminio; in January 2015 it is transferred to Lumezzane. In the summer of 2016 he moved to Catanzaro.

On 4 July 2018, he was released by Monopoli. 

He signed a two-year contract with Virtus Francavilla on 6 July 2018.

On 30 July 2019, he signed a 2-year contract with Cesena.

On 2 January 2020, he joined Reggina on a 1.5-year contract.

On 14 September 2020 he moved to Catania on a 2-year contract.

On 18 August 2021 he signed with Gubbio.

On 11 August 2022 he returns to Catania signing a two-year contract.

References

External links
 Savona profile 
 

1989 births
Living people
Footballers from Milan
Italian footballers
Association football forwards
Serie C players
Serie D players
A.S.D. Trezzano Calcio players
S.G. Gallaratese A.S.D. players
U.S. 1913 Seregno Calcio players
A.C. Gozzano players
Calcio Lecco 1912 players
Savona F.B.C. players
A.S. Giana Erminio players
F.C. Lumezzane V.G.Z. A.S.D. players
U.S. Catanzaro 1929 players
S.S. Monopoli 1966 players
Virtus Francavilla Calcio players
Cesena F.C. players
Reggina 1914 players
Catania S.S.D. players
A.S. Gubbio 1910 players